Giuliana is an Italian language given name ultimately derived from the Latin Iuliana, the feminine form of Iulianus. The name is also often thought to be a combination of Julia (Giulia) and Anna.

Given name
Blessed Giuliana of Collalto (c.1186–1262), Italian Benedictine nun
Giuliana Bruno, Italian-American scholar
Giuliana Camerino (1920–2010), Italian fashion designer 
Giuliana Farfalla (born 1996), German model
Giuliana Furci (born 1978), Chilean-British-Italian mycologist
Giuliana González (born 2002), Argentine footballer 
Giuliana Minuzzo (1931–2020), Italian alpine skier
Giuliana Nenni (1911–2002), Italian journalist and politician
Giuliana Olmos (born 1993), Mexican tennis player
Giuliana Rancic (born 1974), Italian-American television personality

Given names
Feminine given names
Italian feminine given names

war:Giuliana